Ingram Cecil Connor III (November 5, 1946 – September 19, 1973) who was known professionally as Gram Parsons, was an American singer, songwriter, guitarist, and pianist who recorded as a solo artist and with the International Submarine Band, the Byrds, and the Flying Burrito Brothers, popularizing what he called "Cosmic American Music", a hybrid of country, rhythm and blues, soul, folk, and rock.

Parsons was born in Winter Haven, Florida, and developed an interest in country music while attending Harvard University. He founded the International Submarine Band in 1966, but the group disbanded prior to the 1968 release of its debut album, Safe at Home. Parsons joined the Byrds in early 1968 and played a pivotal role in the making of the Sweetheart of the Rodeo album, a seminal album in the country rock genre.  After leaving the group in late 1968, Parsons and fellow Byrd Chris Hillman formed The Flying Burrito Brothers in 1969; the band released its debut, The Gilded Palace of Sin, the same year. The album was well received but failed commercially. After a sloppy cross-country tour, the band hastily recorded Burrito Deluxe. Parsons was fired from the band before the album's release in early 1970.  Parsons spent the first half of 1971 with Keith Richards of the Rolling Stones, living in his French villa Nellcôte during the recording sessions for Exile on Main Street, though he contributed very little to the recording process itself.  After traveling around Britain with friends in late 1971, he was treated for heroin addiction and returned to the U.S., where he was introduced to Emmylou Harris, who assisted him on vocals for his first solo record, GP, released in 1973. Although it received enthusiastic reviews, the release failed to chart.  His health deteriorated due to several years of drug abuse culminating in his death from a toxic combination of morphine and alcohol in 1973 at the age of 26.  A posthumous solo album, Grievous Angel, peaked at number 195 on the Billboard chart.

Parsons's relatively short career was described by AllMusic as "enormously influential" for country and rock, "blending the two genres to the point that they became indistinguishable from each other." He has been credited with helping to found the country rock and alt-country genres. His posthumous honors include the Americana Music Association "President's Award" for 2003 and a ranking at No. 87 on Rolling Stone'''s list of the "100 Greatest Artists of All Time."

Life and career
Early years (1946–1967)
Ingram Cecil Connor III was born on November 5, 1946, in Winter Haven, Florida, to Ingram Cecil "Coon Dog" (1917–1958) and Avis (née Snively) Connor (1923–1965). The Connors normally resided at their main residence in Waycross, Georgia, but Avis returned to her hometown in Florida to give birth. She was the daughter of citrus fruit magnate John A. Snively, who held extensive properties in Winter Haven and in Waycross. Gram's father, Ingram Connor II was a famous World War II flying ace, decorated with the Air Medal, who was present at the 1941 attack on Pearl Harbor. Biographer David Meyer characterized these parents as loving; he wrote in Twenty Thousand Roads that they are "remembered as affectionate parents and a loving couple".

However, he also notes that "unhappiness was eating away at the Connor family": Avis suffered from depression, and both parents were alcoholics. Ingram Connor II died by suicide two days before Christmas in 1958, devastating the 12-year-old Gram and his younger sister, also named Avis. Avis subsequently married Robert Parsons, who adopted Gram and his sister; they took his surname.

Gram Parsons briefly attended the prestigious Bolles School in Jacksonville, Florida, before transferring to the public Winter Haven High School; after failing his junior year, he returned to Bolles. For a time, the family found a stability of sorts. They were torn apart in early 1965, when Robert became embroiled in an extramarital affair and Avis' heavy drinking led to her death from cirrhosis on June 5, 1965, the day of Gram's graduation from Bolles.

As his family was disintegrating around him, Parsons developed strong musical interests, particularly after seeing Elvis Presley perform in concert on February 22, 1956, in Waycross. Five years later, barely in his teens, he played in rock and roll cover bands such as the Pacers and the Legends, headlining in clubs owned by his stepfather in the Winter Haven/Polk County area. By the age of 16, he graduated to folk music, and in 1963 he teamed up with his first professional outfit, the Shilohs, in Greenville, South Carolina. Heavily influenced by The Kingston Trio and The Journeymen, the band played hootenannies, coffee houses and high school auditoriums; as Parsons was still enrolled in prep school, he performed with the group only in select engagements. Forays into New York City (where Parsons briefly lived with a female folk singer in a loft on Houston Street) included a performance at Florida's exhibition in the 1964 New York World's Fair and regular appearances at the Café Rafio on Bleecker Street in Greenwich Village in the summer of 1964. Although John Phillips (an acquaintance of Shiloh George Wrigley) arranged an exploratory meeting with Albert Grossman, the impresario balked at booking the group for a Christmas engagement at The Bitter End when he discovered that the Shilohs were still high school students. Following a recording session at the radio station of Bob Jones University, the group reached a creative impasse amid the emergence of folk rock and dissolved in the spring of 1965.

Despite his middling grades and test scores, Parsons was admitted to Harvard University's class of 1966 on the basis of a strong admissions essay (or, more likely, because his family was rich - his grandfather owned one-third of all the citrus orchards in Florida). Although he claimed to have studied theology (an oblique reference to his close friendship with his residential tutor, Harvard Divinity School graduate student Jet Thomas) in subsequent interviews, Parsons seldom attended his general education courses before departing in early 1966 after one semester. He did not become seriously interested in country music until his time at Harvard, where he heard Merle Haggard for the first time.

In 1966, he and other musicians from the Boston folk scene formed a group called the International Submarine Band. After briefly residing in the Kingsbridge section of the Bronx, they relocated to Los Angeles the following year. Following several lineup changes, the band signed to Lee Hazlewood's LHI Records, where they spent late 1967 recording Safe at Home. The album contains one of Parsons' best-known songs, "Luxury Liner," and an early version of "Do You Know How It Feels," which he revised later in his career. Safe at Home would remain unreleased until mid-1968, by which time the International Submarine Band had broken up.

The Byrds (1968)
By 1968, Parsons had come to the attention of the Byrds' bassist, Chris Hillman, via business manager Larry Spector as a possible replacement band member following the departures of David Crosby and Michael Clarke from the group in late 1967. Parsons had been acquainted with Hillman since the pair had met in a bank during 1967 and in February 1968 he passed an audition for the band, being initially recruited as a jazz pianist but soon switching to rhythm guitar and vocals as well.

Although Parsons was an equal contributor to the band, he was not regarded as a full member of the Byrds by the band's record label, Columbia Records. Consequently, when the Byrds' Columbia recording contract was renewed on February 29, 1968, it was only original members Roger McGuinn and Chris Hillman who signed it. Parsons, like fellow new recruit Kevin Kelley, was hired as a sideman and received a salary from McGuinn and Hillman. In later years, this led Hillman to state, "Gram was hired. He was not a member of the Byrds, ever. He was on salary; that was the only way we could get him to turn up." However, these comments overlook the fact that Parsons, like Kelley, was considered a bona fide member of the band during 1968 and, as such, was given equal billing alongside McGuinn, Hillman, and Kelley on the Sweetheart of the Rodeo album and in contemporary press coverage of the band.Sweetheart of the Rodeo was originally conceived by band leader Roger McGuinn as a sprawling, double album history of American popular music. It was to begin with bluegrass music, then move through country and western, jazz, rhythm and blues, and rock music, before finally ending with the most advanced (for the time) form of electronic music. However, as recording plans were made, Parsons exerted a controlling influence over the group, persuading the other members to leave Los Angeles and record the album in Nashville, Tennessee. Along the way, McGuinn's original album concept was jettisoned in favor of a fully fledged country project, which included Parsons' songs such as "One Hundred Years from Now" and "Hickory Wind", along with compositions by Bob Dylan, Woody Guthrie, Merle Haggard, and others.

Recording sessions for Sweetheart of the Rodeo commenced at Columbia Records' recording studios in the Music Row area of Nashville on March 9, 1968. Midway through, the sessions moved to Columbia Studios, Hollywood, Los Angeles. They finally came to a close on May 27, 1968. However, Parsons was still under contract to LHI Records and consequently, Hazlewood contested Parsons' appearance on the album and threatened legal action. As a result, McGuinn ended up replacing three of Parsons' lead vocals with his own singing on the finished album, a move that still rankled Parsons as late as 1973, when he told Cameron Crowe in an interview that McGuinn "erased it and did the vocals himself and fucked it up." However, Parsons is still featured as lead vocalist on the songs "You're Still on My Mind", "Life in Prison", and "Hickory Wind".

While in England with the Byrds in the summer of 1968, Parsons left the band due to his concerns over a planned concert tour of South Africa, and after speaking to Mick Jagger and Keith Richards about the tour, he cited opposition to that country's apartheid policies. There has been some doubt expressed by Hillman over the sincerity of Parsons' protest. It appears that Parsons was mostly apolitical, although he did refer to one of the younger African-American butlers in the Connor household as being "like a brother" to him in an interview. During this period Parsons became acquainted with Mick Jagger and Keith Richards of The Rolling Stones. Before Parsons' departure from the Byrds, he had accompanied the two Rolling Stones to Stonehenge (along with McGuinn and Hillman) in the English county of Wiltshire. Immediately after leaving the band, Parsons stayed at Richards' house and the pair developed a close friendship over the next few years, with Parsons reintroducing the guitarist to country music. According to Stones' confidant and close friend of Parsons, Phil Kaufman, the two would sit around for hours playing obscure country records and trading off on various songs with their guitars.

The Flying Burrito Brothers (1969–1970)

Returning to Los Angeles, Parsons sought out Hillman, and the two formed The Flying Burrito Brothers with bassist Chris Ethridge and pedal steel player Sneaky Pete Kleinow. Their 1969 album The Gilded Palace of Sin marked the culmination of Parsons' post-1966 musical vision: a modernized variant of the Bakersfield sound that was popularized by Buck Owens amalgamated with strands of soul and psychedelic rock. The band appeared on the album cover wearing Nudie suits emblazoned with all sorts of hippie accoutrements, including marijuana, Tuinal, and Seconal-inspired patches on Parsons' suit. Along with the Parsons-Hillman originals "Christine's Tune" and "Sin City" were versions of the soul music classics "The Dark End of the Street" and "Do Right Woman", the latter featuring David Crosby on high harmony. The album's original songs were the result of a very productive songwriting partnership between Parsons and Hillman, who were sharing a bachelor pad in the San Fernando Valley during this period. The atypically pronounced (for Parsons) gospel-soul influence on this album likely evolved from the ecumenical tastes of bassist Chris Ethridge (who co-wrote "Hot Burrito No. 1 [I'm Your Toy]" and "Hot Burrito No. 2" with Parsons) and frequent jamming with Delaney & Bonnie and Richards during the album's gestation.

Original drummer Eddie Hoh (best known for his work with The Monkees and Al Kooper) proved to be unable to perform adequate takes due to an incipient substance abuse problem and was dismissed after two songs, leading the group to record the remainder of the album with a variety of session drummers, including former International Submarine Band drummer Jon Corneal (who briefly joined the group as an official member, appearing on a plurality of the tracks) and Popeye Phillips of Dr. Hook & the Medicine Show. Before commencing live performances, the group ultimately settled upon original Byrds drummer Michael Clarke. Technically different in comparison to his predecessors, Clarke's striking physical appearance proved to be the primary criterion in this decision; an associate of the band would later recall that "the Burritos had to be pretty" and "Corneal didn't fit" from that standpoint.

While unsuccessful from a commercial standpoint, the album was measured by rock critic Robert Christgau as "an ominous, obsessive, tongue-in-cheek country-rock synthesis, absorbing rural and urban, traditional and contemporary, at point of impact." Embarking on a cross-country tour via train, as Parsons suffered from periodic bouts of fear of flying, the group squandered most of their money in a perpetual poker game and received bewildered reactions in most cities. Parsons was frequently indulging in massive quantities of psilocybin and cocaine, so his performances were erratic at best, while much of the band's repertoire consisted of vintage honky-tonk and soul standards with few originals. Perhaps the most successful appearance occurred in Philadelphia, where the group opened for the reconstituted Byrds. Midway through their set, Parsons joined the headline act and fronted his former group on renditions of "Hickory Wind" and "You Don't Miss Your Water". The other Burritos surfaced with the exception of Clarke, and the joint aggregation played several songs, including "Long Black Veil" and "Goin' Back".

The Flying Burrito Brothers appeared at the Sky River Rock Festival near Sultan, Washington, at the end of August.

After returning to Los Angeles, the group recorded "The Train Song", written during an increasingly infrequent songwriting session on the train and produced by 1950s R&B legends Larry Williams and Johnny "Guitar" Watson. Despite a request from the Burritos that the remnants of their publicity budget be diverted to promotion of the single, it also flopped. During this period, Ethridge realized that he did not share Parsons' and Hillman's affinity for country music, precipitating his departure shortly thereafter. He was replaced by lead guitarist Bernie Leadon, while Hillman reverted to bass.

By this time, Parsons's own use of drugs had increased so much that new songs were rare and much of his time was diverted to partying with the Stones, who briefly relocated to America in the summer of 1969 to finish their forthcoming Let It Bleed album and prepare for an autumn cross-country tour, their first series of regular live engagements in over two years. As the Stones prepared to play the nation's largest basketball arenas and early stadium concerts, the Burritos played to dwindling nightclub audiences; on one occasion, Jagger had to beseech Parsons to fulfill an obligation to his group. As Parsons "became a trust-fund baby when he came of age," he was still receiving about $30,000 per year (equivalent to $210,000 in 2018) from his family trust during this period, "distinguishing him from his many hungry, hard-scrabble peers."

However, the singer's dedication to the Rolling Stones was rewarded when the Burrito Brothers were booked as one of the acts at the infamous Altamont Music Festival. Playing a short set including "Six Days on the Road" and "Bony Moronie," Parsons left on one of the final helicopters and attempted to seduce Michelle Phillips. "Six Days..." was included in Gimme Shelter, a documentary of the event.

With mounting debt incurred, A&M hoped to recoup some of their losses by marketing the Burritos as a straight country group. To this end, manager Jim Dickson instigated a loose session where the band recorded several honky tonk staples from their live act, contemporary pop covers in a countrified vein ("To Love Somebody", "Lodi", "I Shall Be Released", "Honky Tonk Women"), and Larry Williams' "Bony Moronie." This was soon scrapped in favor of a second album of originals on an extremely reduced budget.

Faced with a dearth of new material, most of the album was hastily written in the studio by Leadon, Hillman, and Parsons, with two Gilded Palace of Sin outtakes thrown into the mix. The resulting album, entitled Burrito Deluxe, was released in April 1970. Although it is considered less inspired than its predecessor, it is notable for the Parsons-Hillman-Leadon song "Older Guys" and for its take on Jagger and Richards' "Wild Horses", the first recording released of this famous song. Parsons was inspired to cover the song after hearing an advance tape of the Sticky Fingers track sent to Kleinow, who was scheduled to overdub a pedal steel part; although Kleinow's part was not included on the released Rolling Stones version, it is available on bootlegs. Ultimately—and to the chagrin of Hillman, who was not keen on the song amid the band's creative malaise—Jagger and Richards consented to the cover version.

Like its predecessor, Burrito Deluxe underperformed commercially but also failed to carry the critical cachet of the debut. Disenchanted with the band, Parsons left the Burritos in mutual agreement with Hillman, who was long fatigued by his friend's unprofessionalism. Under Hillman's direction, the group recorded one more studio album before dissolving in the autumn of 1971.

In a recent interview with American Songwriter Chris Hillman explained that "[t]he greatest legacy of the Flying Burrito Brothers and Gram is we were the alternative country band. We couldn't get on country radio and we couldn't get on rock radio! We were the outlaw country band for a brief period."

Solo career and touring with Emmylou Harris (1970–1973)

Parsons signed a solo deal with A&M Records and moved in with producer Terry Melcher in early 1970. Melcher, who had worked with the Byrds and the Beach Boys, was a member of the successful duo Bruce & Terry, also known as The Rip Chords. The two shared a mutual penchant for cocaine and heroin, and as a result, the sessions were largely unproductive, with Parsons eventually losing interest in the project. "Terry loved Gram and wanted to produce him ... But neither of them could get anything done," recalled writer and mutual friend Eve Babitz. "Long lost, the tapes from this session have gathered a legendary patina," writes David Meyer. The recording stalled, and the master tapes were checked out, but there is conflict as to whether "Gram ... or Melcher took them".

He then accompanied the Rolling Stones on their 1971 U.K. tour in the hope of being signed to the newly formed Rolling Stones Records; by this juncture, Parsons and Richards had mulled the possibility of recording a duo album. Moving into Villa Nellcôte with the guitarist during the sessions for Exile on Main Street that commenced thereafter, Parsons remained in a consistently incapacitated state and frequently quarreled with his girlfriend, aspiring actress Gretchen Burrell. Eventually, Parsons was asked to leave by Anita Pallenberg, Richards' longtime domestic partner. Decades later, Richards suggested in his memoir that Jagger may have been the impetus for Parsons' departure because Richards was spending so much time playing music with Parsons. Rumors have persisted that he appears somewhere on the legendary album, and while Richards concedes that it is very likely he is among the chorus of singers on "Sweet Virginia", this has never been substantiated. Parsons attempted to rekindle his relationship with the band on their 1972 American tour to no avail.

After leaving the Stones' camp, Parsons married Burrell in 1971 at his stepfather's New Orleans estate. Allegedly, the relationship was far from stable, with Burrell cutting a needy and jealous figure while Parsons quashed her burgeoning film career. Many of the singer's closest associates and friends claim that Parsons was preparing to commence divorce proceedings at the time of his death; the couple had already separated by this point.

Parsons and Burrell enjoyed the most idyllic time of their relationship in the second half of 1971, visiting old cohorts like Ian Dunlop and Family/Blind Faith/Traffic member Ric Grech in England. With the assistance of Grech and one of the bassist's friends, a doctor who also dabbled in country music and is now known as Hank Wangford, Parsons eventually stopped taking heroin; a previous treatment suggested by William Burroughs proved unsuccessful.

He returned to the US for a one-off concert with the Burritos, and at Hillman's request went to hear Emmylou Harris sing in a small club in Washington, D.C. They befriended each other and, within a year, he asked her to join him in Los Angeles for another attempt to record his first solo album. It came as a surprise to many when Parsons was enthusiastically signed to Reprise Records by Mo Ostin in mid-1972. The ensuing GP (1973) featured several members of Elvis Presley's TCB Band, led by lead guitarist James Burton. It included six new songs from a creatively revitalized Parsons alongside several country covers, including Tompall Glaser's "Streets of Baltimore" and George Jones' "That's All It Took".

Parsons, by now featuring Harris as his duet partner, toured across the United States as Gram Parsons and the Fallen Angels in February–March 1973. Unable to afford the services of the TCB Band for a month, the group featured the talents of Colorado-based rock guitarist Jock Bartley (soon to climb to fame with Firefall), veteran Nashville session musician Neil Flanz on pedal steel, eclectic bassist Kyle Tullis (best known for his work with Dolly Parton and Larry Coryell) and former Mountain drummer N.D. Smart. The touring party also included Gretchen Parsons—by this point extremely envious of Harris—and Harris' young daughter. Coordinating the spectacle as road manager was Phil Kaufman, who had served time with Charles Manson on Terminal Island in the mid-sixties and first met Parsons while working for the Stones in 1968. Kaufman ensured that the performer stayed away from substance abuse, limiting his alcohol intake during shows and throwing out any drugs smuggled into hotel rooms. At first, the band was under-rehearsed and played poorly; however, they improved markedly with steady gigging and received rapturous responses at several leading countercultural venues, including Armadillo World Headquarters in Austin, Texas, Max's Kansas City in New York City, and Liberty Hall in Houston, Texas (where Neil Young and Linda Ronstadt sat in for a filmed performance). According to a number of sources, it was Harris who forced the band to practice and work up an actual set list. Nevertheless, the tour failed to galvanize sales of GP, which never charted in the Billboard 200.

For his next and final album, 1974's posthumously released Grievous Angel, he again used Harris and members of the TCB Band for the sessions. The record generally received more enthusiastic reviews than its predecessor, GP. Although Parsons only contributed two new songs to the album ("In My Hour of Darkness" and "Return of the Grievous Angel"), he was reportedly enthused with his new sound and seemed to have finally adopted a diligent mindset to his musical career, limiting his intake of alcohol and opiates during most of the sessions.

Before recording, Parsons and Harris played a preliminary four-show mini-tour as the headline act in a June 1973 Warner Brothers country rock package with the New Kentucky Colonels and Country Gazette. A shared backing band included former Byrds lead guitarist and Kentucky Colonel Clarence White, Pete Kleinow, and Chris Ethridge. On July 15, 1973, White was killed by a drunk driver in Palmdale, California, while loading equipment in his car for a concert with the New Kentucky Colonels.  At White's funeral, Parsons and Bernie Leadon launched into an impromptu touching rendition of "Farther Along"; that evening, Parsons reportedly informed Phil Kaufman of his final wish: to be cremated in Joshua Tree. Despite the almost insurmountable setback, Parsons, Harris, and the other musicians decided to continue with plans for a fall tour.

In the summer of 1973, Parsons' Topanga Canyon home burned to the ground, the result of a stray cigarette. Nearly all of his possessions were destroyed with the exception of a guitar and a prized Jaguar automobile. The fire proved to be the last straw in the relationship between Burrell and Parsons, who moved into a spare room in Kaufman's house. While not recording, he frequently hung out and jammed with members of New Jersey–based country rockers Quacky Duck and His Barnyard Friends and the proto-punk Jonathan Richman & the Modern Lovers, who were represented by former Byrds manager Eddie Tickner.

Before formally breaking up with Burrell, Parsons already had a woman waiting in the wings. While recording, he saw a photo of a beautiful woman at a friend's home and was instantly smitten. The woman turned out to be Margaret Fisher, a high school sweetheart of the singer from his Waycross, Georgia, days. Like Parsons, Fisher had drifted west and became established in the Bay Area rock scene. A meeting was arranged and the two instantly rekindled their relationship, with Fisher dividing her weeks between Los Angeles and San Francisco at Parsons' expense.

Death

In the late 1960s, Parsons became enamored of and began to vacation at Joshua Tree National Park (then a National Monument) in southeastern California, where he frequently used psychedelics and reportedly experienced several UFO sightings. After splitting from Burrell, Parsons often spent his weekends in the area with Margaret Fisher and Phil Kaufman, with whom he had been living. Scheduled to resume touring in October 1973, Parsons decided to go on another recuperative excursion on September 17. Accompanying him were Fisher, personal assistant Michael Martin, and Martin's girlfriend Dale McElroy. Kaufman later said that Parsons' attorney was preparing divorce papers to serve to Burrell while Parsons remained in Joshua Tree on September 20.

During the trip, Parsons often retreated to the desert, while the group visited bars in the nearby hamlet of Yucca Valley, California, on both nights of their stay. Parsons consumed large amounts of alcohol and barbiturates. On September 18, Martin drove back to Los Angeles to resupply the group with marijuana. That night, after challenging Fisher and McElroy to drink with him (Fisher didn't like alcohol and McElroy was recovering from a bout of hepatitis), he said, "I'll drink for the three of us," and proceeded to drink six double tequilas. They then returned to the Joshua Tree Inn, where Parsons purchased morphine from an unknown young woman. After being injected by her in room #1, he overdosed. Fisher gave Parsons an ice-cube suppository and, later, a cold shower. Instead of moving Parsons around the room, she put him to bed in room #8 and went out to buy coffee in the hope of reviving him, leaving McElroy to stand watch. As his respirations became irregular and later ceased, McElroy attempted resuscitation. Her efforts failed and Fisher, watching from outside, was visibly alarmed. After further failed attempts, they decided to call an ambulance. Parsons was declared dead on arrival at Yucca Valley Hospital at 12:15 a.m. on September 19, 1973, in Yucca Valley. The official cause of death was an overdose of morphine and alcohol."What's up with the strange end of country-rock pioneer Gram Parsons?" , The Straight Dope; accessed September 24, 2017.

According to Fisher in the 2005 biography Grievous Angel: An Intimate Biography of Gram Parsons, the amount of morphine consumed by Parsons would be lethal to three regular users; thus, he had likely overestimated his tolerance in light of his diminished intake despite his extensive experience with opiates. Keith Richards stated in the 2004 documentary film Fallen Angel that Parsons understood the danger of combining opiates and alcohol and should have known better. Upon Parsons' death, Fisher and McElroy were returned to Los Angeles by Kaufman, who dispersed the remnants of Parsons' drugs in the desert.

Before his death, Parsons stated that he wanted his body cremated at Joshua Tree and his ashes spread over Cap Rock, a prominent natural feature there. However, Parsons' stepfather Bob organized a private ceremony back in New Orleans and neglected to invite any of his friends from the music industry. Two accounts state that Bob Parsons stood to inherit Gram's share of his grandfather's estate if he could prove that Gram was a resident of Louisiana, explaining his eagerness to have him buried there.

To fulfill Parsons' funeral wishes, Kaufman and a friend stole his body from Los Angeles International Airport and in a borrowed hearse, they drove it to Joshua Tree. Upon reaching the Cap Rock section of the park, they attempted to cremate Parsons' body by pouring five gallons of gasoline into the open coffin and throwing a lit match inside. What resulted was an enormous fireball. The police gave chase but, as one account puts it, the men "were unencumbered by sobriety," and they escaped. Another telling indicates that the police did not "give chase", but that Kaufman and friend were presumably arrested for an "open-container/motor-vehicle" violation and/or suspected DUI, and somehow escaped that arrest.

The two were arrested several days later. Since there was no law against stealing a dead body, they were only fined $750 for stealing the coffin and were not prosecuted for leaving  of his charred remains in the desert. What remained of Parsons' body was eventually buried in Garden of Memories Cemetery in Metairie, Louisiana.

The site of Parsons' cremation is today known as The Cap Rock Parking Lot. A local myth brings Parsons fans out to a large rock flake known to rock climbers as The Gram Parsons Memorial Hand Traverse. This myth was popularized when someone added a slab that marked Parsons' cremation to the memorial rock. The slab has since been removed by the U.S. National Park Service, and relocated to the Joshua Tree Inn. There is no monument at Cap Rock noting Parsons' cremation at the site. Joshua Tree park guides are given the option to tell the story of Parsons' cremation during tours, but there is no mention of the act in official maps or brochures. Fans regularly assemble simple rock structures and writings on the rock, which the park service periodically remove.

Legacy
Stephen Thomas Erlewine of AllMusic describes Parsons as "enormously influential" for both country and rock, "blending the two genres to the point that they became indistinguishable from each other. ... His influence could still be heard well into the next millennium." In his 2005 essay on Parsons for Rolling Stone magazine's "100 Greatest Artist" list, Keith Richards notes that Parsons' recorded music output was "pretty minimal." Nevertheless, Richards claims that Parsons' "effect on country music is enormous" and adds that this is "why we're talking about him now."

The 2003 film Grand Theft Parsons stars Johnny Knoxville as Phil Kaufman and chronicles a farcical version of the theft of Parsons' corpse. In 2006, the Gandulf Hennig-directed documentary film titled Gram Parsons: Fallen Angel was released.

Emmylou Harris has continued to champion Parsons' work throughout her career, covering a number of his songs over the years, including "Hickory Wind", "Wheels", "Sin City", "Luxury Liner", and "Hot Burrito No. 2". Harris's songs "Boulder to Birmingham", from her 1975 album Pieces of the Sky, and "The Road", from her 2011 album Hard Bargain, are tributes to Parsons.  In addition, her 1985 album The Ballad of Sally Rose is an original concept album that includes many allusions to Parsons in its narrative.  The song "My Man", written by Bernie Leadon and performed by the Eagles on their album On the Border, is a tribute to Gram Parsons. Both Leadon and Parsons were members of the Flying Burrito Brothers during the late 1960s and early 1970s.

The 1973 album Crazy Eyes by Poco pays homage to Parsons, as Richie Furay composed the title track in honor of him, and sings one of Parsons' own compositions, "Brass Buttons."  The album was released four days before Parsons died.

A music festival called Gram Fest or the Cosmic American Music Festival was held annually in honor of Parsons in Joshua Tree, California, between 1996 and 2006. The show featured tunes written by Gram Parsons and Gene Clark as well as influential songs and musical styles from other artists that were part of that era. Performers were also encouraged to showcase their own material. The underlying theme of the event is to inspire the performers to take these musical styles to the next level of the creative process. Past concerts have featured such notable artists as Sneaky Pete Kleinow, Chris Ethridge, Spooner Oldham, John Molo, Jack Royerton, Gib Guilbeau, Counting Crows, Bob Warford, Rosie Flores, David Lowery, Barry and Holly Tashian, George Tomsco, Jann Browne, Lucinda Williams, Polly Parsons, The "Road Mangler" Phil Kaufman, Ben Fong-Torres, Victoria Williams, Mark Olson, and Sid Griffin, as well as a variety of many other bands that had played over the two or three day event. In addition, the Gram Parsons Tribute, in Waycross, Georgia, is a music festival remembering Parsons in the town in which he grew up. Additional tributes spring up every year, the latest being the Southern California "Gram On!" celebration by The Rickenbastards in July, 2013, celebrating the life and legacy of a simple country boy with a dream, Gram Parsons.

In February 2008, Gram's protégée, Emmylou Harris, was inducted into the Country Music Hall of Fame. Despite his influence, however, Parsons has yet to be inducted. Radley Balko has written that "Parsons may be the most influential artist yet to be inducted to either the Rock and Roll or Country Music Hall(s) of Fame. And it's a damned shame."  The Gram Parsons Petition Project (now Gram ParsonsInterNational) was begun in May 2008 in support of an ongoing drive to induct Parsons into the Country Music Hall of Fame. On September 19, 2008, the 35th anniversary of Parsons' death, it was first presented to the Country Music Association (CMA) and Hall as a "List of Supporters" together with the official Nomination Proposal. The online List of Supporters reached 10,000 on the 40th anniversary of his death, with more than 14,000 currently listed. Annual Gram Parsons InterNational concerts in Nashville and various other cities, now in the 14th year, support the petition cause.

In November 2009, the musical theatre production Grievous Angel: The Legend of Gram Parsons premiered, starring Anders Drerup as Gram Parsons and Kelly Prescott as Emmylou Harris. Directed by Michael Bate and co-written by Bate and David McDonald, the production was inspired by a March 1973 interview that Bate conducted with Parsons, which became Parsons' last recorded conversation.

In 2012, Swedish folk duo First Aid Kit released the single "Emmylou" from the album The Lion's Roar. The song's chorus is a lyrical acknowledgment of the Gram Parsons and Emmylou Harris singing partnership, and to the romantic relationship between them that never fully developed before his death.

In the fall of 2012 Florida festival promoter and musician Randy Judy presented his bio-musical Farther Along – The Music and Life of Gram Parsons at Magnoliafest at the Spirit of the Suwannee Music Park.

A Cleveland, Ohio area band, New Soft Shoe, performs as a tribute band to Parsons' music.

A St. Paul, Minnesota band, The Gilded Palace Sinners, is another Parsons' tribute group.

Discography

Tribute albums
 Conmemorativo: A Tribute to Gram Parsons (1993)
 Return of the Grievous Angel: A Tribute to Gram Parsons (1999)

Filmography
 The Trip – band member

Notes

References

 
 

Bibliography

 
 
 Road Mangler Deluxe, Phil Kaufman with Colin White, White-Boucke Publishing, 2005 (3rd edition). 
 Are You Ready for the Country: Elvis, Dylan, Parsons and the Roots of Country Rock, Peter Dogget, Penguin Books, 2001. 
 In the Country of Country: A Journey to the Roots of American Music, Nicholas Dawidoff, Vintage Books, 1998. 
 
 Grievous Angel: An Intimate Biography of Gram Parsons, Jessica Hundley and Polly Parsons, Thunder's Mouth Press, 2005. 
 Proud to Be an Okie: Cultural Politics, Country Music, and Migration to Southern California, Peter La Chapelle. University of California Press, Berkeley, 2007. 
 Gram Parsons: God's Own Singer, Jason Walker, Soundcheck Books, London, 2012. 
 Moody Food, Ray Robertson, SFWP, 2006. 
 Live Fast, Die Young: Misadventures in Rock & Roll America, Chris Price & Joe Harland. Summersdale. 2010. 
 Trailblazers: Gram Parsons, Nick Drake & Jeff Buckley David Bret JRBooks, London, 2009.

External links

The Gram Parsons Fan Site
Officially licensed Gram Parsons T-Shirts by Worn Free 
Swampland Article on Reflections on Gram Parson

Time for a Repress: The Gilded Palace of Sin by Bob Proehl, 30, March 2009

1946 births
1973 deaths
Accidental deaths in California
Alcohol-related deaths in California
American country guitarists
American male guitarists
American country rock musicians
American country singer-songwriters
American folk rock musicians
American male singer-songwriters
American country pianists
American male pianists
Drug-related deaths in California
Harvard University people
Singer-songwriters from Florida
People from Waycross, Georgia
People from Winter Haven, Florida
The Byrds members
The Flying Burrito Brothers members
Winter Haven, Florida
20th-century American singers
Reprise Records artists
A&M Records artists
Rhythm guitarists
20th-century American pianists
Bolles School alumni
Guitarists from Florida
20th-century American guitarists
20th-century American male singers
Singer-songwriters from Georgia (U.S. state)
International Submarine Band members